Zeletin may refer to:

Places in Romania
Zeletin, a village in Cătina Commune, Buzău County
Ariceștii Zeletin, a commune in Prahova County
Zeletin (Bâsca Chiojdului), a river in Prahova and Buzău Counties
Zeletin (Berheci), a river in Bacău, Vrancea and Galați Counties

People
C. D. Zeletin (b. 1935), poet and doctor
Ion Popescu-Zeletin (1907–1974), forestry engineer
Radu Popescu-Zeletin (b. 1947), computer scientist
Ștefan Zeletin (1882–1934), economist and philosopher